A Good Girl Keeps Herself in Good Order is a 1914 Swedish silent drama film directed by Victor Sjöström.

Cast
 Alfred Lundberg as Fellman
 Richard Lund as Sven
 Clara Pontoppidan as Ruth Landén
 Jenny Tschernichin-Larsson as Ruth's Mother

References

External links

1914 films
1910s Swedish-language films
Swedish black-and-white films
1914 drama films
Swedish silent short films
Films directed by Victor Sjöström
1914 short films
Swedish drama films
Silent drama films